Prairie Creek is a stream in Platte County in the U.S. state of Missouri. It is a tributary of the Platte River.

Prairie Creek was so named on account of a prairie near its headwaters.

See also
List of rivers of Missouri

References

Rivers of Platte County, Missouri
Rivers of Missouri